The  is a railway line in Japan, operated by East Japan Railway Company (JR East). It connects Yonezawa Station in Yamagata Prefecture to Sakamachi Station in Niigata Prefecture. At Yonezawa, connections to the Yamagata Shinkansen and Ōu Main Line can be made; while the Uetsu Main Line connects at Sakamachi Station.

Trains can only pass each other at Uzen-Komatsu, Imaizumi, Uzen-Tsubaki, Oguni, Echigo-Kanamaru, and Echigo-Shimoseki stations.

Stations 

Symbols: 
 | - Single-track
 ◇ - Single-track; station where trains can pass
 ^ - Double-track section starts from this point 
 ∨ - Single-track section starts from this point

Rolling stock
, the following rolling stock is used on the Yonesaka Line. All are based at Niitsu Depot.
 KiHa 110 series DMUs
 GV-E400 series DEMUs (since March 2020)

Past
The following rolling stock was used on the Yonesaka Line. All were based at Niitsu Depot.
 KiHa 40/47/48 DMUs (until 2009)
 KiHa 52 DMUs (until 2009)
 KiHa 58 DMUs (until 2009)
 KiHa E120 DMUs (since November 2008, until March 2020)

History
The Yonezawa to Oguni section was opened in stages between 1926 and 1935. The Sakamachi to Echigo-Kanamaru section was opened between 1931 and 1933. The line was completed with the opening of the Oguni to Echigo-Kanamaru section in 1936.

References

External links

 Yonesaka Line Supporters' Association website 

 
Lines of East Japan Railway Company
Rail transport in Yamagata Prefecture
Rail transport in Niigata Prefecture
1067 mm gauge railways in Japan